Banara wilsonii is an extinct species of plant in the family Salicaceae. It was endemic to Cuba. It was threatened by habitat loss.

References

Endemic flora of Cuba
wilsonii
Extinct plants
Taxonomy articles created by Polbot